During the 2017–18 season, Ajax participated in the Eredivisie and the KNVB Cup. They also participated in the UEFA Champions League and the UEFA Europa League but couldn't get past the qualification stage for either competitions. This marked the first time that Ajax did not qualify for the group stage of a UEFA club competition since the 1990–91 season, when they were excluded from competing in European football for a year due to the staafincident. The squad's first training took place on 29 June 2017.

Player statistics 
Appearances for competitive matches only

|-
|colspan="14"|Players sold or loaned out after the start of the season:

|}
As of 6 May 2018

Team statistics

Eredivisie standings 2017–18

Topscorers

Competitions
All times are in CEST

Eredivisie

League table

Matches

KNVB Cup

UEFA Champions League

Third qualifying round

UEFA Europa League

Play-off round

Friendlies

Transfers for 2017–18

Summer transfer window
For a list of all Dutch football transfers in the summer window (1 July 2017 to 31 August 2017) please see List of Dutch football transfers summer 2017.

Arrivals 
 The following players moved to AFC Ajax.

Departures 
 The following players moved from AFC Ajax.

Winter transfer window 
For a list of all Dutch football transfers in the winter window (1 January 2018 to 1 February 2018) please see List of Dutch football transfers winter 2017–18.

Arrivals 
 The following players moved to AFC Ajax.

Departures 
 The following players moved from AFC Ajax.

References

Ajax
AFC Ajax seasons
Ajax